Claude Taleb is a French politician and a member of The Greens-Europe Écologie.

He is regional vice-president in Haute-Normandie and was Dominique Voynet's campaign director in the 2007 presidential election. In 2009, he was selected to be The Greens-Europe Écologie's candidate in Haute-Normandie for the 2010 regional elections.

References

Year of birth missing (living people)
Living people
French politicians